George-Radu Metaxa (11 September 1899 – 8 December 1950) was a Romanian-born American singer, film & stage actor. He was known for his crooning high baritone voice and often portrayed genteel antagonists.

Life and career 

Metaxa was born in Bucharest, Romania, to Nicholas Metaxa and Emilie Theophilatos.
He worked as a civil servant, becoming principle private secretary to the Romanian Ministry of Agriculture before emigrating to London in 1926 to pursue a career in musical comedy.

He first began his showbusiness career recording songs, the first being the Romanian folk song "Mandrulita" in 1927. After engaging with Charles B. Cochran, his first stage billing was in John Hastings Turner's 1929 musical revue Wake Up and Dream. Metaxa was then cast in Noël Coward's operetta Bitter Sweet. He continued to record songs in London until 1931, finishing with Ray Noble's "Goodnight Sweetheart" before moving to New York with the Bitter Sweet touring company.

His career in New York was slow to start, perhaps in part due to the saturation of similar male leads at the time. He nevertheless managed to find roles, his first film role being in Secrets of a Secretary in 1931. Metaxa was cast in the musical The Cat and the Fiddle and later the musical comedy Revenge with Music. He notably starred opposite Ginger Rogers and Fred Astaire in 1936's Swing Time, playing Astaire's love rival, the bandleader Ricky Romero.

He was married to Helene Valoary until their amicable divorce in July 1933, and they had one daughter. He then married 18-year-old actress Margaret Stafford in September 1933. In April 1934, Metaxa and Stafford were involved in an automobile accident in Miami, which killed Stafford and gravely injured Metaxa. He later married Byrnece Macfadden Muckerman (the daughter of American publisher and bodybuilder Bernarr Macfadden) in 1946.

Towards the end of his life, Metaxa's health declined to such a point he had to turn down roles, notably, the leading role in South Pacific that was being shown in London. Metaxa died suddenly of a heart attack 8 December 1950 at a hotel in Monroe, Louisiana, as he and his wife were on their way to their home in Beverly Hills after returning from a seven-month-long trip around Europe.

Selected performances

Film

Stage

References

External links

Male actors from Bucharest
Romanian emigrants to the United States
American film actors
American stage actors
American male musical theatre actors
1899 births
1950 deaths
20th-century American actors
20th-century American singers